The Stratton–Cornelius House is a historic house, located in Portland, Oregon, United States. It is listed on the National Register of Historic Places, and is also listed as a contributing resource in the National Register-listed King's Hill Historic District.

References

1891 establishments in Oregon
Goose Hollow, Portland, Oregon
Houses completed in 1891
Houses on the National Register of Historic Places in Portland, Oregon
Queen Anne architecture in Oregon
Historic district contributing properties in Oregon
Portland Historic Landmarks